Khadeen Carrington (born October 3, 1995) is a Trinidadian-American basketball player for Hapoel Jerusalem of the Israeli Basketball Premier League. He played college basketball for Seton Hall. The son of former professional soccer player and coach Reynold Carrington, he starred at Bishop Loughlin Memorial High School in Brooklyn, New York. As a senior, he led the Catholic High School Athletic Association (CHSAA)'s Class AA division in scoring with 24.2 points per game and was named the Brooklyn Boys' Player of the Year by the New York Daily News. Carrington was a highly sought-after recruit and received several college offers, but chose Seton Hall. As a junior at Seton Hall, he was named to the Second-team All-Big East and averaged 17.1 points per game. Carrington's scoring declined to 15.6 points per game as a senior but he led the Pirates to an NCAA Tournament win over NC State.

Early life and high school career
Carrington is the son of Reynold Carrington, a former professional soccer player and coach from Trinidad and Tobago. His older brother Kariym played Division II basketball. Khadeen first started playing basketball at the age of eight. Carrington attended Bishop Loughlin Memorial High School and averaged 22.5 points per game as a sophomore to lead the team to the Catholic High School Athletic Association (CHSAA) Class AA intersectional quarterfinals. He was an All-City second team selection by the New York Post as a sophomore. Carrington competed in Amateur Athletic Union play with the New York Lightning. As a junior, Carrington averaged 24.7 points per game and was a Daily News All-City first-team selection. He teamed with Mike Williams to lead Bishop Loughlin to a CHSAA 'AA' intersectional championship game.

Carrington led the CHSAA's Class AA division in scoring with 24.2 points per game as a senior and had one 42-point game. He was named the Brooklyn Boys' Player of the Year by the New York Daily News. Carrington was also named the CHSAA Player of the Year as he led the Lions to the Catholic Intersectional title game. He finished his career with 2,196 points — the most in school history. Carrington was ranked the 127th best player in the Class of 2014 by Rivals.com. He received collegiate offers from Iowa State, Dayton, St. John's, Rutgers, Cincinnati, Pittsburgh, Providence, Iowa, West Virginia, South Carolina, DePaul and Hofstra. Eventually, he settled for Seton Hall, joining fellow Brooklyn product Isaiah Whitehead. He credited his commitment to feeling a connection with Seton Hall coach Kevin Willard and the staff.

College career
As a freshman, Carrington started eight games but mostly played as a backup to Isaiah Whitehead. However, with Whitehead missing several games in January 2015 due to a foot injury, Carrington was able to demonstrate his potential, contributing 17 points in an overtime win against Villanova. Carrington posted 8.8 points and 2.9 rebounds per game in his freshman season. He had his first double-double in an 83–63 win over Marquette on December 30, 2015, with 17 points and 10 rebounds. Carrington scored 27 points in a Big East Tournament game against Creighton as a sophomore. He averaged 14.1 points and 2.5 assists per game.

Carrington averaged 19.2 points per game during the 2016–17 non-conference season, but hit a slump in the early part of conference play due to increased defensive attention and a dislocated pinkie finger.  He scored 41 points in an 87–81 win against Creighton on February 15, 2017 and had 10 points in the final minute. In the NCAA tournament loss against Arkansas, Carrington had 22 points and four turnovers. He was a Second Team All-Big East selection as a junior. Carrington averaged 17.1 points, 3.1 rebounds and 2.9 assists per game as a junior while shooting 42.4 percent from the field and 38.2 percent from three-point range. He tested the waters of the 2017 NBA draft but ultimately returned to Seton Hall.

Coming into his senior year, Carrington and Angel Delgado were named to the preseason All-Big East First Team. He made the switch to point guard over the summer by studying video with coach Kevin Willard and assistant Shaheen Holloway. On January 6, 2018, Carrington scored a season-high 29 points in a comeback win over Butler. He was Big East Player of the Week on February 26, after leading Seton Hall to a win against Providence by scoring 25 points. Carrington led the Pirates to their first NCAA tournament victory in 14 years as a senior, scoring 26 points to defeat NC State. He was named to the First Team All-Met after averaging 15.6 points and 4.4 assists per game. “It sounds weird, but I really enjoyed the ups and downs,” Carrington said of his Seton Hall career. “The downs taught me a lot. It made me become a man. I learned a lot of things here in my four years, not only on the court but off the court — probably more off the court.” After the season Carrington was invited to the Portsmouth Invitational Tournament.

Professional career
After going undrafted in the 2018 NBA draft, Carrington signed with the Detroit Pistons for the NBA Summer League. On July 21, 2018, he signed a contract with Montenegrin team Mornar. Carrington then played for Limburg United of the Belgian league and averaged 14.1 points, 4.8 assists and 3.6 rebounds per game. On July 3, 2019, he signed with Riesen Ludwigsburg of the Basketball Bundesliga. He averaged 17.2 points, 3.9 rebounds, and 3.3 assists per game for the team. His season high 27 points came on October 20, against Ratiopharm Ulm.

On July 19, 2020, Carrington signed a two-year deal with TD Systems Baskonia of the Liga ACB and the EuroLeague. On September 11, 2020, Carrington was released because he experiencing delays with the renewal of his Trinidadian passport due to the COVID-19 pandemic.

On September 15, 2020, he has signed with Monaco of the LNB Pro A. On October 19, Carrington was ruled out for several months after tearing his ACL.

On August 5, 2021, he signed with Real Betis of the Liga ACB. Carrington averaged 6.9 points, 1.9 rebounds, 1.2 steals and 1.1 assists per game.

On November 15, he signed with JDA Dijon Basket of the LNB Pro A.

On July 19, 2022, he signed with Hapoel Jerusalem of the Israeli Basketball Premier League.

References

External links
Khadeen Carrington at proballers.com
Seton Hall Pirates bio
Twitter handle

1995 births
Living people
ABA League players
American expatriate basketball people in Belgium
American expatriate basketball people in Germany
American expatriate basketball people in Monaco
American expatriate basketball people in Montenegro
American expatriate basketball people in Spain
American men's basketball players
Basketball players from New York City
Bishop Loughlin Memorial High School alumni
Hapoel Jerusalem B.C. players
JDA Dijon Basket players
KK Mornar Bar players
Limburg United players
Point guards
Real Betis Baloncesto players
Riesen Ludwigsburg players
Seton Hall Pirates men's basketball players
Shooting guards
Sportspeople from Brooklyn
Trinidad and Tobago men's basketball players